The VisitMyrtleBeach.com 300 was a race run by NASCAR Xfinity Series at Kentucky Speedway in Sparta, Kentucky, United States. It was first run in 2012, and was won by the winner of the Feed the Children 300, Austin Dillon. This race was used as a filler for the Kentucky Indy 300 race that ran here from 2001 to 2011, Starting in 2016, it was the first race in the Round of 12 for the NASCAR Xfinity Series playoffs. On March 8, 2017, it was announced that Las Vegas Motor Speedway, another SMI track, would get a second Cup date, a second Xfinity date, and a second Truck date. While the Fall Cup race and Truck race at New Hampshire Motor Speedway went there, Kentucky lost this race and was moved to Las Vegas

History
The first time that this race was run was in 2012, and it was won by the contender and winner of the NASCAR Rookie of the Year award, and pole winner, Austin Dillon.

Despite being off the schedule since 2017, the race was briefly restored during the 2020 season as a replacement for the New Hampshire Motor Speedway event due to the COVID-19 pandemic, in a July doubleheader with the Alsco 300. The race, the Shady Rays 200, was held the day before the Alsco 300.

Past winners

2015 & 2020: Race extended due to a green–white–checker finish.
2017: Race distance time and average speed record.
2020: Race added Due to Covid 19 Pandemic Replaced New Hampshire Motor Speedway.

Multiple winners (drivers)

Multiple winners (teams)

Manufacturer wins

References

External links
 

2012 establishments in Kentucky
Former NASCAR races
NASCAR Xfinity Series races
 
Recurring sporting events established in 2012
Recurring sporting events disestablished in 2017

de:Meijer 300